Missouri Town Living History Museum is a  outdoor history museum located in Fleming Park east of Lake Jacomo in Jackson County, Missouri.

Site description
Missouri Town 1855 consists of more than 25 structures, dating from before the Civil War (1820 to 1860). This antebellum open-air museum shows 19th-century lifestyle using interpreters dressed in period attire, the growing of various crops of the era, along with livestock (many rare).

Missouri Town 1855 was never an actual town. It is a representation of a mid-19th-century Missouri town, consisting of buildings which were moved there from other locations in Missouri. Buildings include:
Barns (c. 1840, 1848, 1855, 1860)
Chicken Coop (c. 1830–1850)
Church (c. 1850)
Colonel’s House (c. 1855)
Hog Shed (c. 1838)
Law Office (c. 1880)
Mercantile
Schoolhouse (c. 1860)
Smokehouses (c. 1830–1850)
Stagecoach stop
Tavern (c. 1850)
Various Homes
Well House

Programs and activities 
There are workshops available from spring to fall. The official website should be referenced for details, as they vary from year to year.

See also
 Historical reenactment
 List of tourist attractions providing reenactment
 Living history

References

Museums in Jackson County, Missouri
Kansas City metropolitan area
Protected areas of Jackson County, Missouri
Parks in the Kansas City metropolitan area
Parks in Missouri
Open-air museums in Missouri
Living museums in the United States